Samuel Joseph Haskins (11 November 1926 – 26 November 2009), was a British photographer, born and raised in South Africa. He started his career in Johannesburg and moved to London in 1968. Haskins is best known for his contribution to in-camera image montage, Haskins Posters (1973) and the 1960's figure photography trilogy Five Girls (book) (1962), Cowboy Kate & Other Stories (1964) and November Girl (book) (1967), plus an ode to sub-saharan tribal Africa "African Image (book) (1967)  .

He suffered a stroke on 19 September 2009 the opening day of his exhibition to launch Fashion Etcetera at Milk Gallery in New York, and died at home in Bowral, Australia, nine weeks later.

 Youth 
Haskins was born in Kroonstad in the province of the Orange Free State of South Africa. His father Ben was a goods inspector on South African Railways. Early creative influences were fueled by an interest in magic tricks, kite making, drawing and the circus. A talented athlete, as a teenager he excelled at hurdling and trained with a circus, resulting in a job offer as a trapeze catcher.

 Education 
Haskins' formal higher education was at the Johannesburg Technical College 1945–1948, where he did a general arts course followed by a part-time photographic module. Between 1949 and 1951, he studied at the London School of Printing and Graphic Arts in Bolt Court, later renamed the London College of Printing, and now the London College of Communication.

 Marriage and children 
Haskins married Alida Elzabe van Heerden in 1952 and they had two sons; Ludwig (4 August 1955) and Konrad (27 January 1963). They adopted a daughter, Heidi in 1960, but she died in infancy.  Alida gave up a career in fashion soon after their marriage to become Haskins' business partner. She played a key role in the launch of his career by acting as a publishing agent for Five Girls when he was still an unknown photographer. She continued to negotiate worldwide publication of his books, apart from Fashion Etcetera, his last project, a book and exhibition in New York, managed by Ludwig. Alida died on 5 December 2012. Haskins' artistic estate is now owned and managed by his son Ludwig. Konrad Haskins, Ludwig's younger brother and only sibling died on 23 March 2014.

 Career summary 
Haskins started his career as an advertising photographer in Johannesburg in 1953. He ran what was probably the first modern freelance advertising studio in Africa. He produced commercial work across a very broad spectrum of photography from still life to industrial, fashion and aerial. His first formal creative output was a one-man show at the popular Johannesburg department store John Orrs in 1960. This featured black-and-white photography of models in the studio and included some photographs of dolls made by the young Elisabeth Langsch, who went on to become Switzerland's leading ceramist.

His international reputation and his signature photographic passions were established by four key books published in the 1960s. Five Girls (1962) explored a fresh approach to photographing the nude female figure and contained important first explorations with black-and-white printing, cropping and book design, which were a key feature of his subsequent books. Cowboy Kate & Other Stories (1964) was probably the first book to deliberately explore black-and-white photographic grain as a medium for expression and image design. It was highly influential at the time, sold roughly a million copies worldwide and won the Prix Nadar in France in 1964. It continues to influence contemporary photographers, film makers, fashion designers and make-up artists. Cowboy Kate & Other Stories or 'Kate' as the book is often referred to, had its place in photographic history cemented in 2005 when the International Center of Photography in New York included the book in their exhibition The Open Book: A History of the Photographic Book from 1878 to the Present.November Girl (1967) contained key image collages which formed the basis of many graphic and surrealist experiments in the 1970s and 1980s. African Image (1967) was a visual homage to the indigenous people, culture, landscape and wildlife of sub-Saharan Africa. The images represent a lifelong interest in photographing graphically stimulating environments and formally document his passion for indigenous craft. He broke bones on river rapids and wrote off two Volvo saloon cars on African dirt roads while shooting the book. Despite its international award, this meticulously constructed book, celebrating a love for sub-Saharan Africa, is probably the least known of his major creative projects, but it is coveted by serious collectors of African art and photography.

In 1968, Haskins moved to London and ran a studio in Glebe Place just off the King's Road. He worked as an advertising photographer for international consumer brands Asahi Pentax, Bacardi, Cutty Sark whisky, Honda, BMW, Haig whisky, DeBeers, British Airways, Unilever and Zanders, and specialised in the art direction and shooting of calendars, especially for Asahi Pentax in Japan. Although he endorsed Hasselblad for a short period in the late 1960s and early 1970s, his loyalty to the medium format 6x7 camera and lenses from Asahi resulted in a rare long-term association between a camera manufacturer and photographer. From 1970 to 2000, Asahi Optical (later Pentax) produced 30 calendars, of which Haskins shot and art-directed 15 editions including the millennium calendar. No other photographer was invited to contribute more than once. He is still involved with the Pentax Forum Gallery in Tokyo, which hosts his exhibitions. His first contact came in 1967, when Asahi Optical presented him with a 35 mm camera after hearing that he had shot African Image with various competitors' products.

In 1972, he produced his first colour book, Haskins Posters. The large-format publication contained pages printed on one side using a thick stiff paper and a soft glue perfect binding allowing the pages to be removed and used as posters. Haskins and Alida successfully published the book internationally through their own company, Haskins Press. The book won a gold award at the New York One Show. At the time the best-known image from Haskins Posters, a girl's face superimposed on an apple with a bee near the stem, appeared on the cover or in editorials of almost every major photographic magazine around the world. This image was part of a well-publicised visual and graphic experimentation with the apple theme in the 1970s that for a while resulted in photographic journalists nicknaming him 'Sam the Apple man'.

The images in Haskins Posters traversed different creative themes that all became signature passions for Haskins' image-making over the next three decades; graphically strong compositions of nudes characterised by a natural essence in the models, while the image-making explored themes of graphic experimentation, humour and sensual eroticism. Haskins had a recurring theme (rooted in his training as a painter) of creating tension in the surface of his photographs between flat graphic elements and 3D chiaroscuro. Those results were often achieved with sophisticated lighting and/or double exposures. A highly creative and design driven approach to lighting almost always played a key role in Haskins' work, both in the studio and on location. He often developed complex lighting designs for a single specific shot that were never repeated, a late example being a fashion shoot for New York magazine's 75th anniversary issue shot in New York's Pier 57 studios in August 2006.

Haskins also often sculpted and painted graphic elements for his photographs and drew inspiration from a combination of surrealism, illustration, film and modern graphic designers.

The graphic experiments first seen in Haskins Posters and related exhibitions at London's Photographer's Gallery and National Theatre, resulted in a book called Photo Graphics (1980). The title of the book coined a new term in photography that has since become widely used.

Haskins' next book, Sam Haskins á Bologna (1984), resulted from an invitation by the mayor of Bologna to photograph the city. The publication was accompanied by an exhibition in the city. This project led to two more homages to visually rich locations shot over a series of visits; Barcelona (1991) and Kashmir (between 1992 and 1994).

From 2000 to 2005, he focused on fashion photography for Vogue, Harper's Bazaar, Allure and New York. A shortage of copies of the original edition of Cowboy Kate & Other Stories (1964), which was selling to collectors for up to US$3,000, led Haskins to bring out a digitally remastered 'director's cut' version in October 2006, published by Rizzoli in New York. Apart from image editing and layout revisions, the new version had 16 pages of new images.

In 2002, Haskins and Alida moved to the Southern Highlands of New South Wales, Australia, and built the third house-studio of their partnership. The move away from London resulted in a renaissance in Haskins' fashion photography. While he had always had a passion for fashion from the start of his career, and Cowboy Kate influenced fashion designers, who credited Haskins, he had not been courted by the mainstream fashion world and did not court them. A shoot for Yves Saint Laurent in Paris in 2002 resulted in a 'rediscovery' that led to a stream of assignments in London, New York, Paris, Tokyo and Sydney, working for fashion houses and magazines.

In December 2006, a month after his 80th birthday, the first retrospective exhibition of his work (with a portraiture bias) opened at the National Portrait Gallery in Canberra (Australia). That was also his first exhibition at a national museum/gallery. The show ran for four and a half months to 22 April 2007.

The exhibition contained several portraits of other artists never seen before, including one of the late Jean-Michel Folon, a graphic artist much admired by Haskins. Although one or two of the images from that personal portrait project had previously been published, the majority remained part of a quiet collection built up over decades of meeting and befriending other artists.

In 2009, Haskins published, under the family imprint The Haskins Press, his first book in 24 years. Fashion Etcetera is a thematic slice through his archive that explores a lifelong passion for fashion, style and design. The book was produced over three years working in close collaboration with his son Ludwig and his grandson Oren, and is dedicated to Ludwig and Oren. In 2009, the last year of Haskins' life, his "Fashion Etcetera" book and exhibition received widespread global publicity, and in the process, turned images of Gill from 'Five Girls' (1962) into one of the new-found icons of the 1960s. Following the death of Haskins' wife, Alida Haskins, on 5 December 2012, the Haskins estate is now 100% owned and managed by Ludwig, who continues to publish and exhibit his father's work and negotiate image rights.

 Slide show 

Haskins developed a medium format slide show comprising up to 500 images, each displayed for seven seconds, synchronised to music. They were shown with a traditional manual projector operated by Haskins using a darkroom timer. First shown in Brighton at an international photo conference in 1970, the show was hugely popular, filling theatres, cinemas and convention halls at photo conferences and public performances in over 50 cities around the world.

The initial format of the slides was 6cmx6cm, because all Haskins' medium format images at that point had been shot using Hasselblad and Rolleiflex cameras. Haskins took delivery of his first Pentax 6x7 in 1970 in Tokyo but it took several years to build up a body of 6x7 slides. The conversion of the slides to 6x7 format took place in 1975 and it was at that point that the show gained a much higher profile internationally.

 Teaching and assessing 
Haskins ran one-week photographic training workshops in Italy, Sweden and South Africa in the 1970s. He returned to his alma mater, The London College of Printing, in 1975 as outside assessor on the photographic diploma course, a position he maintained until 1982.

Between 1980 and 1985, he ran one-week workshops for writers, cinematographers, directors and set designers at Norwegian Television's training school in Oslo.

The rest of his teaching was usually at one-day workshops at photo conferences and to groups visiting his studio. Haskins maintained close links with Syracuse University in the US, hosting groups of visiting students at his studio in London every summer from 1975 to 1988.

 Bibliography 

 Books by Haskins 

 'Cowboy Kate and other stories — Director's Cut' published in 2006 is entirely digitally remastered by the author with edits to the original story and 16 additional pages of images.

Printed in offset litho as opposed to the original which was photo gravure printed in Switzerland.

 The two editions of Fashion Etcetera are technically identical apart from the covers.

 Books with images by Haskins 

(1) The Art Director's Index is a paid entry publication but on this occasion the publishers requested editorial material from Sam.

 Haskins - Art history and criticism 

(1) Masters of the 20th Century'' is a book featuring graphic designers and typographers with the work of only two photographers, viewed in this context as photographic illustrators; Haskins and Rankin Waddell.

Awards

Solo exhibitions

Group exhibitions

Works in public collections 
 Victoria and Albert Museum, London
 National Portrait Gallery, London
 National Portrait Gallery, Canberra
 City of Bologna, Italy
 Munich City Museum, Germany
 Museum of Art, Lugano, Switzerland

Documentaries

Notes

External links 
 Haskins' site
 Haskins' blog
 Atlas Gallery, London
 Grob Gallery, Geneva
 
 Sam Haskins on Instagram
 CNN Video
 New York Times video and article
 Eye magazine
 Professional Photographer magazine
 The New Yorker
 Tommy Hilfiger talking with Sam Haskins in NY, 2009
 Sam Haskins - a talk by his son Ludwig at Coventry University, 2011

1926 births
2009 deaths
South African photographers
Fashion photographers
Commercial photographers
Portrait photographers
Industrial photographers